Aminu Abdallah (born 7 January 1994) is a Ghanaian professional footballer.

Career

Early career
Abdullah spent five years with Ghanaian club International Allies before joining Major League Soccer club Vancouver Whitecaps FC in May 2013. Before joining Vancouver, Abdallah trained with several major European sides, including Juventus, CSKA Moscow, and PSV Eindhoven.

Abdullah made his professional debut on 22 March 2014 in a 1–1 draw against Orlando City.

Vancouver waived Abdallah on 27 June 2014.

References

External links 
 

1994 births
Living people
Ghanaian footballers
Ghanaian expatriate footballers
Vancouver Whitecaps FC players
Vancouver Whitecaps FC U-23 players
Charleston Battery players
Association football midfielders
Footballers from Accra
Expatriate soccer players in Canada
Expatriate soccer players in the United States
USL League Two players
USL Championship players
International Allies F.C. players